Bub Asman (born August 17, 1949, in Louisville, Kentucky) is a sound editor known for his collaborations with director Clint Eastwood. He and his colleagues on the 2006 film Letters from Iwo Jima won the Academy Award for Best Sound Editing, and were nominated the same year for Flags of Our Fathers. He also won for the 2014 film American Sniper. He shared both awards with Alan Robert Murray.

He is a brother of cinematographer William L. Asman and re-recording mixer John Asman. He began his career (with brother John) as a film editor on Lee Jones' The Hidan of Maukbeiangjow (1973) and films of William Girdler.

References

External links

Living people
Asman, John
People from Louisville, Kentucky
American sound editors
Best Sound Editing Academy Award winners